The France Sevens, also called the Paris Sevens, is an annual international rugby sevens tournament that is one of ten competitions on the annual World Rugby Sevens Series. The France Sevens is generally held in May or June on the weekend following the London Sevens and is the last competition in the Sevens Series. France has also hosted tournaments within the European Sevens Grand Prix Series, often at Lyon.

History
From 1996 to 1999 the tournament was known as the Air France Sevens, and in the year 2000 it was part of the inaugural IRB Sevens World Series.

The IRB hosted the tournament at Bordeaux in 2004, before returning to Paris for 2005 and 2006. The event was effectively replaced in the World Sevens Series by the Scotland Sevens at Edinburgh for the 2006-07 season.

Between 2011 and 2015, Lyon hosted a leg of the European circuit, the Sevens Grand Prix Series.

The Sevens World Series returned to France for the 2015-16 season, with the revival of the Paris Sevens tournament in 2016.

International sevens

Invitational tournament

World Rugby Sevens Series

European Grand Prix
In most years since 2011, France has hosted a leg of the Sevens Grand Prix Series, a multi-leg competition sponsored by Rugby Europe every summer involving teams from Europe.

See also
 France Women's Sevens

References

 
World Rugby Sevens Series tournaments
International rugby union competitions hosted by France
Rugby sevens competitions in Europe
Recurring sporting events established in 1996